Siegena (minor planet designation: 386 Siegena) is a very large main-belt asteroid. It is classified as a C-type asteroid and is probably composed of primitive carbonaceous material.

It was discovered by Max Wolf on March 1, 1894, in Heidelberg.

During 1999, the asteroid was observed occulting a star. The resulting chords provided a diameter estimate of 174 km.

References

External links
 
 

Background asteroids
Siegena
Siegena
C-type asteroids (SMASS)
C-type asteroids (Tholen)
18940301